Geraint Howell Thomas,  (born 25 May 1986) is a Welsh professional racing cyclist who currently rides for UCI WorldTeam , Wales and Great Britain. He is one of the few riders in the modern era to achieve significant elite success as both a track and road rider, with notable victories in the velodrome, in one-day racing and in stage racing. On the track, he has won three World Championships (2007, 2008, and 2012), and two Olympic gold medals (2008 and 2012), while on the road he won the 2018 Tour de France becoming the first Welshman and British-born rider to win it.

His early successes were in track cycling, in which he was a specialist in the team pursuit. He won three World Championships and was Olympic gold medallist twice, in 2008 and 2012. Thomas had an early win on the road at the 2004 Paris–Roubaix Juniors and later had a senior victory at the 2010 British National Road Race Championships. Leaving track cycling to focus solely on the road, he subsequently found success in both one-day/classic races such as the 2014 Commonwealth Games road race and the 2015 E3 Harelbeke, and in one week stage races, most notably at the 2016 Paris–Nice, the 2017 Tour of the Alps, the 2018 Critérium du Dauphiné, the 2020 Tour de Romandie and the 2022 Tour de Suisse.

In cycling's grand tours, Thomas was initially a lead domestique to Chris Froome in his victories. He won the first stage of the 2017 Tour de France, an individual time trial, to become the first Welshman to wear the Tour's yellow jersey. He later crashed in that race, as well as in the 2017 Giro d'Italia. Thomas became the first Welsh person ever to win the Tour de France when he won the tournament in 2018. He gained the yellow jersey by winning stage 11, extended his lead by winning stage 12, and retained the lead for the remainder of the event. In the same year he won the BBC Sports Personality of the Year Award, becoming the first Welshman to win the ward since Ryan Giggs in 2009. In 2019, he confirmed his Grand Tour pedigree when he reached the podium again, having finished runner-up in the Tour de France behind Team Ineos teammate Egan Bernal. In 2022, Thomas became the first ever Welshman to win the Tour de Suisse and later that year won another podium finish at the 2022 Tour de France, placing third.

Notable for his all-round ability and adaptability rather than mastery of one specialism, Thomas has been competitive in individual time-trials, on the cobbles, in the Spring classics and in the mountains of Grand Tours, where he was the first rider in the history of the Tour de France to win at Alpe d'Huez while in yellow.

Early life and amateur career
Born in Cardiff, Wales, Thomas attended Whitchurch High School. He began cycling with the Maindy Flyers Cycling Club at Maindy Stadium at the age of 10, where he rode with future Team Sky teammate Luke Rowe, before going on to ride for other local clubs, Cycling Club Cardiff and Cardiff Just in Front. His first race bike was a blue Giant. Following some successes in under 14 and under 16 events, including National Championships, his first notable success came when he won silver medal in the points race at the 2004 UEC European Track Championships, at that time a junior and under-23 event.

Professional career

2005–2006: Early years
Thomas became a member of British Cycling's Olympic Academy. He won the Carwyn James Junior Award at the BBC Wales Sports Personality of the Year ceremony. Thomas competed at World Cup events around the world, and was training in Sydney, Australia, in February 2005 when he crashed after the rider in front of him hit a piece of metal in the road which was flicked up into Thomas's wheel. He suffered internal bleeding after the piece of metal entered his body during the fall, rupturing his spleen which subsequently had to be removed.

He also rode a few races, such as the Tour of Britain, for the Great Britain squad.

2007: Tour de France debut

Thomas made his Tour de France debut at the 2007 race as the youngest rider in the race as  picked up one of the three wildcard spots allocated for the race. He became the first Welsh rider to compete in the race since Colin Lewis in 1967. Thomas received great support from Welsh fans at the opening of the race, with several following the entire race. He completed his first Tour de France, finishing 140th of 141 finishers.

He was nominated for the BBC Wales Sports Personality of the Year award in 2007. The winners were announced on 2 December, and Thomas came third in the public vote.

2008: Olympic gold
Thomas did not compete in the Tour de France, instead, he rode the Giro d'Italia earlier in the season before returning to Britain to concentrate on preparations for the Summer Olympics in Beijing. On discovering that the flags of non-participating nations would not be allowed at the Games, Thomas said: "It would be great to do a lap of honour draped in the Welsh flag if I win a gold medal, and I'm very disappointed if this rule means that would not be possible."

On 17 August, Thomas was a member of the Olympic team pursuit squad which broke the world record in the heats with a time of 3:55.202, beating their Russian opponents comfortably to go through to the final ride-off for silver and gold. The following day, on their way to winning the gold medal, the British Team pursuit broke their own world record in a time of 3:53.314, beating their Danish competitors by 6.7 seconds. Thomas had been a possible contender in the individual pursuit, but opted not to ride both events as he did not want to compromise the efforts of his team. He had also been considered to compete in the Madison with Bradley Wiggins but it was Mark Cavendish who was selected to do so; Chris Boardman stated that "Geraint keeps surpassing people's expectations".

Following the disqualification of fellow  teammate, Moisés Dueñas, from the Tour de France, Thomas expressed his strong anti-doping opinions on his blog on the BBC 6-0-6 website: "...if someone is fraudulent in a business, wouldn't they be facing a prison term? I don't see how riders taking drugs to win races and lying to their teams is any different. Bang them up and throw away the key!"

In December, he was appointed Member of the Order of the British Empire (MBE) in the 2009 New Year Honours.

2009

Thomas suffered a bad start to his 2009 season when he broke his pelvis and fractured his nose in a fall; he crashed into a safety barrier having misjudged a turn in the time trial stage of the Tirreno–Adriatico in Macerata, Italy. The crash came shortly after an  time check showed he was second fastest on the road. Although he was able to return to his team hotel from hospital the same day, a period of 20 days complete rest was required before he would be able to resume training.

On 30 October 2009, Thomas set the fastest pursuit time under current rules, at the time, when he completed  in 4:15.105 at the first round of the 2009–10 UCI Track Cycling World Cup Classics at Manchester Velodrome. Thomas's time was only surpassed by Chris Boardman's 4:11.114, set in 1996 on a bicycle position that had since been banned. On 1 November, on the last day of the World Cup round, Thomas was a member of the team pursuit squad which set the second-fastest time ever on their way to the gold medal, setting a new track record of 3 minutes 54.395 seconds in the process.

Thomas was runner-up to Ryan Giggs in the BBC Wales Sports Personality of the Year award in 2009; the winners were announced on 8 December. He left Barloworld at the end of 2009 to join new British team, .

2010: Move to Team Sky
Thomas began 2010 as part of the team time trial winning team for Sky at the Tour of Qatar. After competing in the classics, he impressed at the Critérium du Dauphiné, finishing in the top ten in each of the opening four stages. As a result of these finishes, he was the leader in green jersey competition for stages two, four and six. He finished fifth in the green jersey competition overall, and twenty-first in the general classification.

Thomas beat teammate Peter Kennaugh to win the 2010 British National Road Race Championships. His good form continued into the Tour de France, in which he finished fifth in the prologue, a second behind the highest-placed overall contender Lance Armstrong. He then finished second on stage three, a stage that was marred by numerous crashes and splits in the peloton, which Thomas managed to avoid. This led to him leading the young rider classification after stage three. He finished 67th overall in the Tour, and ninth in the young rider classification.

Thomas had been due to travel to Delhi, India, in September to compete in the Commonwealth Games, but pulled out, as did several other cyclists, due to health concerns. Dengue fever was one specific concern cited. Illness was especially a risk for Thomas following the removal of his spleen in 2005. Following the decision, Thomas said "It's a massive disappointment, I only get to ride for Wales once every four years, but that's the decision I had to make."

2011

Thomas started 2011 with some promising performances in the classics, finishing sixth in the Classica Sarda and second in the Dwars door Vlaanderen before placing tenth in the Tour of Flanders Thomas claimed his first professional victory in May, by winning the five-day Bayern Rundfahrt race, after finishing second on stage 3 and fifth on stage 4. On 26 June 2011, Thomas finished second to Bradley Wiggins in the British National Road Race Championships.

At the Tour de France, Thomas finished sixth on the opening stage to take the white jersey. He retained the jersey the following day, as Sky finished third in the team time trial. Thomas lost the white jersey to Robert Gesink on stage 7, as team leader Bradley Wiggins crashed out of the Tour, and the remaining Sky riders lost time after waiting for him. Thomas won the combativity award on the  stage 12, following an aggressive breakaway  into the first Pyrenean stage, that saw him lose control twice on the descent of La Hourquette d'Ancizan. Thomas signed a new three-year contract with Sky after stage 16. He finished 31st overall in the Tour.

Thomas had a successful Tour of Britain, winning the points classification, having been highly placed in the overall standings before a crash. He was part of the Great Britain team for the road race at the UCI Road World Championships, and helped lead out Mark Cavendish to victory.

2012: Second gold

Thomas focused on track cycling for the 2012 season, competing at the Summer Olympics in London. As such, the Giro d'Italia was his road race priority, before turning his focus to the track. In March, Thomas did ride Paris–Nice, where he helped Bradley Wiggins take overall victory. On 4 April Thomas was a member of the British team pursuit team that won gold at the UCI Track Cycling World Championships in Melbourne, with a new world record of 3:53.295 seconds. He also teamed up with Ben Swift to take the silver medal in the madison. Thomas then returned to the road, winning the prologue of the Tour de Romandie.

Thomas finished second behind Taylor Phinney in the opening time trial of the Giro d'Italia. Thomas acted as lead out man to Mark Cavendish in the race, helping him to three stage victories. Thomas also finished second to Marco Pinotti in the final stage time trial in Milan.

Thomas was selected for the team pursuit team for the Olympics, along with Steven Burke, Ed Clancy and Peter Kennaugh. On 2 August the quartet set a new world record of 3:52.499 in the first heat of the event. The team set the fastest time in the first round, setting up a final with Australia to decide the gold medal winners. In the final, the British team set another world record of 3:51.659, finishing nearly three seconds ahead of the Australians, with Thomas retaining his gold medal in the event.

2013

Thomas began the 2013 season at the Tour Down Under. He won stage 2 after attacking on the Corkscrew climb, and outsprinting three riders that had joined him on the descent. Thomas held the race lead until the penultimate stage, where he cracked on Old Willunga Hill and dropped to fifth overall. However, he fought back on the final stage in Adelaide, taking enough bonus seconds to rise to third place overall, 25 seconds behind Dutch rider Tom-Jelte Slagter, and won the sprints classification.

Thomas was given a leadership role in Sky's Classics campaign. His best results were a couple of fourth places in Omloop Het Nieuwsblad and E3 Harelbeke, as he crashed out of contention in Milan–San Remo, the Tour of Flanders and Paris–Roubaix. After a break, Thomas returned to action at the Bayern Rundfahrt, where he finished second overall. He showed excellent climbing form at the Critérium du Dauphiné, helping Chris Froome and Richie Porte secure a 1–2 overall finish, whilst also placing 15th overall himself.

He was selected to ride the Tour de France, but crashed heavily on the opening stage. Thomas started the next stage but struggled, finishing second last and after returning to hospital was found to have a fractured pelvis. Despite his injury, Thomas continued, and managed to finish the Tour in 140th place, helping Froome take overall victory.

2014

Thomas once again started the season at the Tour Down Under, this time riding in support of Richie Porte, and finishing eighth overall. Thomas was again scheduled to support Porte at Paris–Nice, but an injury to Froome meant that Porte was switched to Tirreno–Adriatico, leaving Thomas to lead the squad in France. Thomas performed strongly, finishing second to 's Tom-Jelte Slagter on the fourth stage, to take the leader's yellow jersey, before dropping to second behind Carlos Betancur on the sixth stage. The next day however, Thomas hit a tree on a descent  from the finish; although he would complete the stage some seven minutes in arrears, Thomas did not start the final stage. Thomas recovered to take his good form into the Classics season, finishing third in E3 Harelbeke. He led  at the Tour of Flanders and managed an eighth-place finish, 37 seconds behind the winning rider, Fabian Cancellara, having had to chase back after being dropped on the Taaienberg climb. Thomas also secured a hard-fought seventh position in Paris–Roubaix, finishing as part of a group twenty seconds behind solo winner Niki Terpstra having been active in an earlier break with Tom Boonen.

In May, Thomas won the overall classification at Bayern Rundfahrt for the second time in his career, after winning the individual time trial on Stage 4.

In the Tour de France, Thomas acted as a domestique to Sky teammate Richie Porte, following the withdrawal of his compatriot Chris Froome on stage five. Porte soon fell down the overall standings after suffering badly on stage thirteen to Chamrousse. Thomas was then given the freedom to go for stage wins and appeared in a number of breakaways. Thomas was the only Briton to finish the race, placing 22nd overall, his best ever result in the Tour de France.

Thomas represented Wales at the Commonwealth Games in Glasgow. He won bronze in the individual time trial behind Alex Dowsett of England and Rohan Dennis of Australia. Thomas won gold in the road race after attacking Scott Thwaites and Jack Bauer on the final lap of the Glasgow city centre circuit, and built up a large enough gap to survive a scare when he had to change a wheel in the closing stages. Thomas rounded off his season with sixth overall at the Eneco Tour in August.

In December, Thomas was voted the BBC Wales Sports Personality of the Year.

2015

In February 2015 Thomas won the second stage of the Volta ao Algarve after following an attack by Rein Taaramäe on the final climb of the day, before going clear and holding off the chasers on the descent to the finish, 19 seconds ahead of the Estonian and 23 seconds ahead of the peloton to take the race lead. He defended the lead by placing third in the time trial on stage 3, and fourth on stage 4, which finished on the summit of the Alto do Malhão and was won by teammate Richie Porte. He finished safely on the final stage to claim overall victory.

Thomas's next race was Paris–Nice. He took second place on the race's queen stage to the Col de la Croix de Chaubouret, again behind Porte. He lost time on the penultimate stage of the race, after crashing on a wet descent, but continued and finished fifth in the overall standings. The following week, he took part in the Milan–San Remo. He attacked on several occasions during the race, most significantly on the descent of the Cipressa. Although he led the race solo over the top of the Poggio, he was caught soon afterwards and finished just behind the front group. Five days later, Thomas became the first British rider to win the E3 Harelbeke, attacking from a 3-man breakaway with Zdeněk Štybar and Peter Sagan in the closing stages and holding on to triumph. Two days later Thomas finished third in Gent–Wevelgem behind Luca Paolini and Niki Terpstra, despite being blown off his bike and crashing due to a gust of wind in extreme weather conditions.

Thomas placed fifth in the concluding time trial on stage 9, missing out on overall victory by a gap of five seconds to Simon Špilak.

At the Tour de France Thomas played a support role for Chris Froome, helping him navigate a first week featuring crosswinds, hill top finishes, cobblestones and a team time trial. This result meant Thomas rose to fifth overall on the general classification. He dropped down to sixth after finishing just over half a minute behind Alberto Contador on stage 14 from Rodez to Mende. On stage 16, Warren Barguil lost control approaching a hairpin bend the descent of the Col de Manse and collided with Thomas, causing him to crash head first into a telegraph pole and fall into a ditch. However Thomas escaped serious injury, and was able to complete the stage and lost just 38 seconds to the leading group. He subsequently moved up to fourth overall after stage 17 to Pra-Loup, when Tejay van Garderen pulled out of the race due to illness and Contador lost time due to a crash. However he struggled on stage 19's climb up La Toussuire, finishing 22 minutes behind stage winner Vincenzo Nibali and sliding down to 15th place in the general classification, 27 minutes and 24 seconds off Froome.

In August he was named in the start list for the Vuelta a España.

2016: Paris–Nice victory
In February 2016, Thomas retained his Volta ao Algarve title, after placing fifth on the decisive fifth stage behind Alberto Contador.

In March 2016, Thomas led Team Sky at Paris–Nice. On stage 6, Thomas finished second to Ilnur Zakarin on a mountain top finish at Madone d'Utelle to take the race lead by 15 seconds over Contador. Thomas was able to defend his lead on the final stage, with assistance from teammate Sergio Henao, after Contador repeatedly attacked and distanced Thomas on the final climb of the Col d'Èze. Thomas crossed the finish line in Nice 11 seconds after Contador to win the race by 4 seconds.

In May 2016, it was reported that Thomas had signed a two-year contract extension keeping him at Sky until the end of 2018 season. However the following month he clarified that the contract was for one year with the option of a further year.

In July 2016 Thomas was part of the Team Sky squad at the Tour de France that aided Chris Froome in securing his third Tour de France overall win. Thomas finished 15th overall for the second year in succession.

Thomas was selected to ride the Olympic Road Race. Thomas re-mounted, and managed to finish in 11th place two and a half minutes adrift of gold medallist Greg Van Avermaet (Belgium). Thomas also received a late entry for the Olympic time trial and finished 9th.

2017

In January 2017, Team Sky announced that Thomas would share leadership with Mikel Landa at the Giro d'Italia.

In March 2017, Thomas led Sky at Tirreno–Adriatico. However, their opening team time trial was marred by a crash suffered by Gianni Moscon, when his front wheel disintegrated at high speed. Moscon fell to the tarmac, suffering abrasions, but was able to remount. On stage 2, with  remaining, Thomas and 's Bob Jungels attacked on the 16% steep climb towards Pomarance, pulling Tim Wellens, and  duo Tejay van Garderen and Damiano Caruso – in the leader's blue jersey – away with them. He finished fifth overall, 58 seconds behind Quintana.

In April 2017, Thomas became the first British rider to win the Tour of the Alps (formerly known as the Giro del Trentino). Thomas won the third stage of the race, taking the leader's fuchsia jersey as a result, and ultimately won by seven seconds ahead of Thibaut Pinot. Thomas began the Giro d'Italia strongly, finishing third on stage 4 to Mount Etna to sit second overall for the rest of the first week. However, on stage 9, as the peloton approached the final climb of the day to Blockhaus, Wilco Kelderman of  collided with a police motorcycle which had been parked at the side of the road. This caused him to swerve to his right into the Sky riders, who were in a line in the peloton, and resulted in Thomas and the majority of his teammates being brought down. Thomas reported his shoulder "popped out" during the crash, but he remounted to complete the stage, dropping to 17th in the standings, five minutes and 14 seconds behind Nairo Quintana. After a rest day, Thomas recovered to finish second to Tom Dumoulin on stage 10, a  individual time trial, to move back up to 11th overall. However, after losing further time on the next two stages, Thomas withdrew from the race with a worsening knee injury.

At the Tour de France, Thomas won the opening stage, a  individual time trial, making him the first Welsh rider to wear the yellow jersey in the event. He held the yellow jersey until Stage 5, when he dropped to second overall behind teammate Chris Froome after finishing tenth on La Planche des Belles Filles. Thomas crashed out of the race on a descent on Stage 9 whilst placed second overall and suffered a broken collarbone.

2018: Tour de France victory
Thomas began his 2018 season in February at the Volta ao Algarve, where he won the  individual time trial on Stage 3 to increase his overall race lead. However, he missed out on overall victory on the final stage when a 31-man breakaway went clear in the opening kilometres including his teammate, the second placed rider Michał Kwiatkowski. Kwiatkowski held on to win the stage on the Malhão to take overall victory by 1 minute 31 seconds over Thomas. In March, Thomas again suffered misfortune whilst leading Tirreno–Adriatico when on Stage 4 he suffered a mechanical issue  from the summit of the final climb to Sarnano–Sassotetto that saw him lose 34 seconds and the overall leader's blue jersey. In April, Thomas returned to Paris–Roubaix, but abandoned after crashing in the opening cobbled sector of the race.

In June, Thomas led Team Sky at the 2018 Critérium du Dauphiné in the absence of Chris Froome, who had won the Giro d'Italia a week earlier. Thomas crashed during the opening prologue and finished over 20 seconds down on Kwiatkowski, who won the stage. Team Sky won the team time trial on Stage 3 with Thomas rising to fourth overall. Thomas took the race lead after finishing second on Stage 5 to Valmorel and increased his lead over Adam Yates to 1 minute 29 seconds on the following stage. Despite having to chase back twice after suffering two punctures on the final stage, Thomas held on to take overall victory ahead of Yates and Romain Bardet.

In July, Thomas entered the Tour de France as a domestique riding in support of 's leader Froome, who was going for a record-equalling fifth Tour de France victory, even as Thomas was one of the top contenders who could compete for the overall victory. A crash for Froome on stage 1 saw him lose time to Thomas and  finished second behind  in the second stage team time trial. After avoiding the crashes and mechanical problems suffered by many of the other overall contenders in the first week, Thomas sat second overall when the race entered the Alps on Stage 10, just 43 seconds behind the leader Greg Van Avermaet, whilst Froome was in eighth place. and speculation over team leadership began, though Thomas himself diplomatically fielded any questions regarding leadership: "I think it's early to be talking about that", Thomas said about any disputes over leadership between him and Froome. "Maybe if I’m still right there after Alpe d'Huez [on stage 12], it's a bit different than. But we haven’t even done a proper climb yet. I’m certainly not getting carried away".

On Stage 11, with a steep finishing climb to La Rosière, Thomas attacked from the group of favourites, including Froome,  from the finish and caught up with Tom Dumoulin, who had attacked on the stage's penultimate climb. Thomas attacked again in the final kilometre to distance Dumoulin, and he passed lone breakaway rider Mikel Nieve in sight of the finish line to take the stage win and the race leader's yellow jersey. The following day, Thomas won Stage 12 in a sprint finish at Alpe d'Huez ahead of Dumoulin and Froome, who arose as the likely contenders for overall victory in Paris. By doing so he became the first rider to win a Tour de France stage at Alpe d'Huez in the yellow jersey and the first British winner at Alpe d'Huez in the Tour de France.

Froome's challenge faded on the approach to the summit and he dropped to third position in the general classification, 2:31 behind Thomas. Dumoulin moved into second place, 1:59 off the lead. On the mountainous stage nineteen from Lourdes to Laruns, Primož Roglič of  attacked on the final climb, the Col d'Aubisque, and soloed to the finish nineteen seconds ahead of the chasing group of overall favourites. Thomas was able to consolidate his position in the yellow jersey by picking up six bonus seconds in the sprint thereby extending his lead over Dumoulin to 2 minutes, 5 seconds. The penultimate stage was a  time trial, Dumoulin won the stage, one second ahead of Froome. Thomas survived a scare when his back wheel locked, but completed the time trial successfully, finishing fourteen seconds behind Dumoulin, taking a lead of 1 minute, 51 seconds into the final stage. He held the lead all the way to Paris to become only the third ever British, first British-born and first Welsh cyclist to win the Tour de France.

On 9 August, Thomas attended a homecoming event organised in Cardiff in his honour, appearing in front of 3,000 people outside the Senedd in Cardiff Bay where he was greeted by First Minister of Wales Carwyn Jones before riding alongside a group of young riders to Cardiff Castle, where a crowd of 8,000 heard him speak. In September 2018 the Wales National Velodrome in Newport was officially renamed the Geraint Thomas National Velodrome: Thomas attended the renaming ceremony after the first stage of the 2018 Tour of Britain finished in the city.

In December, Thomas was named BBC Wales Sports Personality of the Year for the second time, before he went on to win the main BBC Sports Personality of the Year Award. He was appointed Officer of the Order of the British Empire (OBE) in the 2019 New Year Honours for services to cycling.

2019: Tour runner-up
After celebrating his 2018 Tour victory, Thomas was overweight at the start of the 2019 season. His only result of note before the Tour was a third-place overall finish at the Tour de Romandie in early May.

In June, Thomas abandoned the Tour de Suisse following a crash, and required recovery time, which put his ability to perform at the Tour in doubt. His Ineos teammate Egan Bernal went on to win the race. Thomas and Bernal were named as joint team leaders for the 2019 Tour de France, after Chris Froome was ruled out of the race after suffering a serious crash at the Critérium du Dauphiné although some in the media expected an internal battle between the two. Bernal had been planned to lead his team's Giro squad, but missed the race after he broke his collarbone. His major wins of the season up to the Tour were the Paris–Nice stage race before his injury and the Tour de Suisse on his return.

On Stage 2, Ineos placed second behind  in a team time trial. . The tenth stage was on relatively flat terrain. This effort proved decisive, as several overall contenders who were caught behind, including Thibaut Pinot, Richie Porte, Rigoberto Urán, Jakob Fuglsang and Mikel Landa, lost time on the front group. Thomas, Bernal, Alaphilippe maintained their position at the front of the race, amongst a reduced bunch. By the first rest day, the general classification was led by Alaphilippe, who had a lead of 1' 12" on Thomas, behind whom was Bernal in third place, just 4" from Thomas.

On Stage 13, an individual time trial to Pau, Alaphilippe took the victory to extend his lead, with a time of 35' 00" across the  course, achieving a victory on a day where he was expected to lose time to riders such as Thomas, who ended up in second place, fourteen seconds down. On stage 14, the last of the breakaway riders were caught by the leading group of general classification contenders at  before the finish atop the hors catégorie Col du Tourmalet. With  remaining, Thomas got detached from the lead group containing Alaphilippe, Emanuel Buchmann, Pinot, Bernal, Landa and Steven Kruijswijk. Pinot attacked in the final  and held his lead to the finish line at the summit. On the final stage in the Pyrenees, Simon Yates took his second stage win of the race from a reduced breakaway of six at the summit of the  first-category climb to Prat d'Albis. Pinot attacked the group of general classification contenders with  remaining to finish in second place with Landa, 33 seconds behind, progressing to fourth overall. The duo of Bernal and Buchmann came in 33' down, followed by the last few breakaway riders, and then the group of favourites, led by Thomas, who finished 1' 22" behind Yates. The following day was the Tour's second rest day. By this point, overall race leader Alaphilippe was exceeding expectations, with a 1' 35" lead over Thomas. Kruijswijk was third at 1' 47", followed by Pinot, Bernal and Buchmann respectively.

Stage 18, the first in the Alps, was led by breakaway riders throughout the stage's climbs, which included the first-category Col de Vars and the hors catégorie Col d'Izoard and Col du Galibier. With  remaining of the Galibier, Bernal attacked from within the group of general classification contenders containing Alaphilippe and Thomas, allowing Bernal to recover half a minute on his rivals by the finish and move up to second overall. Around  into stage 19, Pinot, who had been placed fifth in the general classification, abandoned the race with a leg muscle injury. At the head of the race in the closing kilometres of the planned second to last climb, the hors catégorie Col de l'Iseran, Bernal attacked from the group of overall contenders, catching and passing final breakaway riders by the summit. Alaphilippe was dropped following Bernal's attack, and was two minutes behind at the summit. During the descent, the race was neutralised when a hailstorm caused ice and landslides to block the route to the final climb to Tignes, particularly a mudslide at the foot of the descent before Val-d'Isère. Times for the general classification were taken at the summit of the Iseran, with the stage victory and most combative rider of the day not awarded. As a result, Bernal, who had been in second place overall, moved ahead of Alaphilippe and took the yellow jersey. A group of 29 riders established a two-and-a-half minute lead over the peloton, before being vastly reduced to six on the early slopes of the Val Thorens climb. With  remaining, Nibali attacked from this group and soloed to victory, ten seconds ahead of chasers Landa and Alejandro Valverde. Close behind, Bernal and Thomas led the other general classification contenders Urán, Buchmann and Kruijswijk. Alaphilippe was dropped again, losing three minutes to Bernal and dropping from second overall to fifth. Thomas therefore finished the race in second place overall, 1' 11" down on Bernal.

2020
After a year disrupted by the COVID-19 pandemic, Thomas did not ride the Tour de France, after a mutual decision with his team, instead focusing his efforts on the Giro d'Italia. He entered September's Tirreno–Adriatico, ahead of the Giro d'Italia the following month. He finished second to compatriot Simon Yates on the fifth stage, which finished at the  ski resort; he ultimately finished the race in second overall, behind Yates. In between Tirreno–Adriatico and the Giro d'Italia, Thomas made his first appearance in the time trial at the UCI Road World Championships, finishing 4th. A crash on the third stage of the Giro d'Italia fractured his pelvis, and ended his season. The race was eventually won by his domestique, compatriot and teammate Tao Geoghegan Hart.

2021
In the Volta a Catalunya, Thomas finished third overall, behind  teammates Adam Yates and Richie Porte. He then won the Tour de Romandie on the final day, moving ahead of Michael Woods, before finishing third at the 2021 Critérium du Dauphiné, winning the fifth stage. During the Tour de France he, along with many other riders, ran into crashes and bad luck during the first week. He did finish the Tour, finishing 41st overall while riding in support of Richard Carapaz, who took the final podium place.

2022 : Third Tour podium and stage race success
At the Tour de Suisse, he was part of an  team that included Adam Yates, Daniel Martínez and Tom Pidcock. After gaining bonus seconds on the third stage, he trailed race leader Aleksandr Vlasov by seven seconds after the fifth stage. Following Vlasov's positive COVID-19 test ahead of the sixth stage, Thomas moved up to second overall, one second behind Jakob Fuglsang. Both were overhauled by Sergio Higuita on the seventh stage, with Higuita leading Thomas by two seconds going into the final individual time trial stage in Liechtenstein. Thomas finished second on the day to Remco Evenepoel, with Higuita finishing more than a minute down, which gave Thomas the overall victory. This was the fourth different major week-long stage race he had won, and his tenth podium in such races, eight of which came after the age of 30. His previous victories coming in Paris–Nice, the Tour de Romandie and the Critérium du Dauphiné. Thomas had previous secured runners-up in GC in the 2015 Tour de Suisse.

The 2022 Tour de France would be the 12th time Thomas rode the Grand Boucle. He entered the race along with teammates Adam Yates, Dani Martínez and Tom Pidcock with no one rider being the clear team favourite. Thomas proved himself to be the strongest rider in the race, save Jonas Vingegaard and Tadej Pogačar, and by the Pyranees was the only rider left within striking distance of the two. Between the Alps and the Pyrenees there was rumor that Pogačar sought an alliance with Thomas, to which Thomas replied that they weren't speaking the night before discussing tactics, but whatever happens during the race, happens. Into the third week he was finally distanced by the two main protagonists, while being well ahead of the remainder of the peloton in the Pyranees. He rode well enough to put himself in position to finish on a Tour podium for the third time in his career. His strong performance during the final ITT made him the only rider to finish within ten minutes of Vingegaard and Pogačar on the road, and secured his podium position.

In the 2022 Commonwealth Games he earned Wales a bronze medal in the time trial, despite an early crash costing him almost half a minute.

In popular culture

Welsh-speaking fans of Geraint had begun singing a version of Titw Tomos Las by Hogia'r Wyddfa, a popular Welsh-language quintet from the 1960s and 1970s. The song, which is about the blue tit bird (Titw Tomos Las in Welsh) emphasised Geraint's surname, spelt Tomos in Welsh. BBC Radio Cymru promptly recorded an updated version of the song with two members of Hogia'r Wyddfa as well as contemporary group, Siddi, and brass band, Band Pres Llareggub, as well as local children. The song was recorded for Aled Hughes's morning programme on the national Welsh language station and shared on social media.

Welsh singer-songwriter Max Boyce wrote a poem in honour of Thomas's Tour de France victory, "The Boy Who Climbed a Mountain", which Boyce performed at Thomas's Cardiff homecoming event in August 2018.

In December 2019, an hour-long documentary titled Geraint Thomas:The Road Will Decide was broadcast on the BBC. It followed Thomas' 2018 Tour de France win as well as the feelings of his wife, Sara.

Personal life
Thomas met his wife, Sara Elen Thomas, through a mutual friend. The couple reside in Monaco, and were married in St Tewdrics House Chepstow, Wales, a Grade II listed Italianate villa that they purchased in October 2015. Geraint and Sara still own the property to this day and it is run as a wedding venue. The couple have a son, whose birth was announced on 4 October 2019. Thomas is a fan of Arsenal F.C.

Career achievements

Major results

Road

2003
 1st Kuurne–Brussels–Kuurne Juniores
 3rd Road race, National Junior Championships
2004
 1st Road race, Welsh National Championships
 1st Paris–Roubaix Juniors
 1st Stage 1 Acht van Bladel
 2nd Overall Junior Tour of Wales
 5th Flanders-Europe Classic
2005
 1st Road race, Welsh National Championships
2006
 1st  Overall Flèche du Sud
1st  Points classification
1st  Young rider classification
1st Stage 2
 1st Smithfield Nocturne
 3rd Road race, National Championships
2009
 5th Coppa Bernocchi
 6th Overall Tour of Britain
2010
 National Championships
1st  Road race
3rd Time trial
 1st Stage 1 (TTT) Tour of Qatar
 Tour de France
Held  after Stages 3–6
2011
 1st  Overall Bayern Rundfahrt
 1st  Points classification, Tour of Britain
 2nd Road race, National Championships
 2nd Dwars door Vlaanderen
 6th Classica Sarda
 10th Tour of Flanders
 Tour de France
Held  after Stages 1–7
 Combativity award Stage 12
2012
 1st Prologue Tour de Romandie
2013
 2nd Overall Bayern Rundfahrt
 3rd Overall Tour Down Under
1st  Sprints classification
1st Stage 2
 3rd  Team time trial, UCI World Championships
 4th Omloop Het Nieuwsblad
 4th E3 Harelbeke
 10th Overall Tour of Qatar
2014
 Commonwealth Games
1st  Road race
3rd  Time trial
 1st  Overall Bayern Rundfahrt
1st Stage 4 (ITT)
 2nd Time trial, National Championships
 3rd E3 Harelbeke
 6th Overall Eneco Tour
 7th Paris–Roubaix
 8th Overall Tour Down Under
 8th Tour of Flanders
2015
 1st  Overall Volta ao Algarve
1st  Points classification
1st Stage 2
 1st E3 Harelbeke
 1st Stage 1 (TTT) Tour de Romandie
 2nd Overall Tour de Suisse
 3rd Gent–Wevelgem
 5th Overall Paris–Nice
2016
 1st  Overall Paris–Nice
 1st  Overall Volta ao Algarve
 9th Time trial, Olympic Games
2017
 1st  Overall Tour of the Alps
1st Stage 3
 Tour de France
1st Stage 1 (ITT)
Held  after Stages 1–4
Held  after Stage 1
 3rd  Team time trial, UCI World Championships
 5th Overall Tirreno–Adriatico
1st Stage 2
 7th Overall Tour of Britain
2018
 1st  Time trial, National Championships
 1st  Overall Tour de France
1st Stages 11 & 12
 1st  Overall Critérium du Dauphiné
1st Stage 3 (TTT)
 2nd Overall Volta ao Algarve
1st Stage 3 (ITT)
 3rd Overall Tirreno–Adriatico
 4th UCI World Tour
2019
 2nd Overall Tour de France
 3rd Overall Tour de Romandie
2020
 2nd Overall Tirreno–Adriatico
 4th Time trial, UCI World Championships
2021
 1st  Overall Tour de Romandie
 3rd Overall Critérium du Dauphiné
1st Stage 5
 3rd Overall Volta a Catalunya
2022
 1st  Overall Tour de Suisse
 3rd Overall Tour de France
 Commonwealth Games
3rd  Time trial
8th Road race

General classification results timeline

Classics results timeline

Major championships timeline

Track

2004
 1st  Scratch, UCI World Junior Championships
 2nd  Points race, UEC European Junior Championships
2005
 National Championships
1st  Scratch
1st  Team pursuit
 UIV Talent Cup
1st Madison (with Mark Cavendish), Bremen
1st Madison (with Ben Swift), Dortmund
2006
 UEC European Championships
1st  Team pursuit
2nd  Scratch
 UCI World Cup Classics
1st Team pursuit, Moscow
3rd Team pursuit, Sydney
3rd Madison (with Mark Cavendish), Sydney
 2nd  Team pursuit, UCI World Championships
 2nd Team pursuit, National Championships
 3rd  Points race, Commonwealth Games
2007
 1st  Team pursuit, UCI World Championships
 UCI World Cup Classics
1st Team pursuit, Beijing
2nd Madison (with Rob Hayles), Manchester
2008
 1st  Team pursuit, Olympic Games
 1st  Team pursuit, UCI World Championships
 UCI World Cup Classics
1st Team pursuit, Copenhagen
1st Team pursuit, Manchester
2009
 UCI World Cup Classics
1st Individual pursuit, Manchester
1st Team pursuit, Manchester
 National Championships
1st  Individual pursuit
2nd Madison (with Luke Rowe)
2010
 3rd Scratch, National Championships
2011
 1st  Team pursuit, UEC European Championships
 UCI World Cup Classics
1st Team pursuit, Manchester
2nd Individual pursuit, Manchester
2012
 1st  Team pursuit, Olympic Games
 UCI World Championships
1st  Team pursuit
2nd  Madison (with Ben Swift)
 2nd Team pursuit, UCI World Cup, London

World records

Awards and honours 
 BBC Sports Personality of the Year 2018
 BBC Wales Sports Personality of the Year 2014, 2018

See also 

 2012 Summer Olympics and Paralympics gold post boxes
 List of British cyclists
 List of British cyclists who have led the Tour de France general classification
 List of multiple Olympic gold medalists
 List of Olympic medalists in cycling (men)
 List of people from Cardiff
 World record progression track cycling – Men's team pursuit
 Yellow jersey statistics

Notes

References

Further reading

External links 

 
 
 Geraint Thomas at British Cycling
 
 
 
 
 
 

1986 births
Living people
Welsh male cyclists
UCI Track Cycling World Champions (men)
Commonwealth Games bronze medallists for Wales
Cyclists at the 2006 Commonwealth Games
Cyclists at the 2014 Commonwealth Games
Welsh Olympic medallists
Cyclists at the 2008 Summer Olympics
Cyclists at the 2012 Summer Olympics
Cyclists at the 2016 Summer Olympics
Cyclists at the 2020 Summer Olympics
Olympic cyclists of Great Britain
Olympic gold medallists for Great Britain
Sportspeople from Cardiff
Officers of the Order of the British Empire
People educated at Whitchurch High School
Olympic medalists in cycling
Medalists at the 2012 Summer Olympics
Medalists at the 2008 Summer Olympics
British cycling road race champions
Commonwealth Games gold medallists for Wales
Commonwealth Games medallists in cycling
British male cyclists
British Tour de France stage winners
Welsh track cyclists
Tour de France winners
BBC Sports Personality of the Year winners
Medallists at the 2006 Commonwealth Games
Medallists at the 2014 Commonwealth Games